Apple 1 or variation, may refer to:

 Apple I, the first home computer from Apple Computer (Apple Inc.)
 Apple One, the subscription service from Apple, Inc.
 APPLE 1, a single released by Apple Records; see Apple Records discography
 Apple-1 (1955), a nuclear bomb test, part of Operation Teapot

See also
 Apple (disambiguation)
 1 (disambiguation)